Sarangarh-Bilaigarh district is one of the four new district in the state of Chhattisgarh, India announced by Bhupesh Baghel on 15th August 2021. It is carved out from Raigarh and Baloda Bazar districts.

Demographics

At the time of the 2011 census, Sarangarh-Bhilaigarh district had a population of 607,434. Sarangarh-Bhilaigarh district has a sex ratio of 1005 females to 1000 males. 7.14% of the population lives in urban areas. Scheduled Castes and Scheduled Tribes make up 173,819 (28.62%) and 80,958 (13.33%) of the population respectively. Hinduism is the predominant religion, practiced by 99.32% of the population.

At the time of the 2011 Census of India, 89.99% of the population in the district spoke Chhattisgarhi, 7.69% Odia and 1.79% Hindi as their first language.

References

Districts of Chhattisgarh